Wilfrid Augustine Hodges, FBA (born 27 May 1941) is a British mathematician and logician known for his work in model theory.

Life
Hodges attended New College, Oxford (1959–65), where he received degrees in both Literae Humaniores and (Christianic) Theology. In 1970 he was awarded a doctorate for a thesis in Logic. He lectured in both Philosophy and Mathematics at Bedford College, University of London. He has held visiting appointments in the department of philosophy at the University of California and in the department of mathematics at University of Colorado. Hodges was Professor of Mathematics at Queen Mary College, University of London from 1987 to 2006 and is the author of books on logic.

Honors and awards
Hodges was President of the British Logic Colloquium, of the European Association for Logic, Language and Information and of the Division of Logic, Methodology, and Philosophy of Science. In 2009 he was elected a Fellow of the British Academy.

Writing style

Hodges' books are written in an informal style. The "Notes on Notation" in his book "Model theory" end with the following characteristic sentence:

'I' means I, 'we' means we.

When this 780-page book appeared in 1993, it became one of the standard textbooks on model theory. Due to its success an abbreviated version (but with a new chapter on stability theory) was published as a paperback.

Bibliography

Only first editions are listed.

References

External links
Home page of Wilfrid Hodges

1941 births
20th-century British philosophers
Academics of Queen Mary University of London
Alumni of New College, Oxford
British logicians
20th-century British mathematicians
21st-century British mathematicians
Living people
Model theorists
University of California faculty
University of Colorado faculty
Fellows of the British Academy